Kawasakia is a genus of fungi in the family Dipodascaceae. A monotypic genus, it contains the single species Kawasakia arxii.

References

Saccharomycetes
Monotypic Ascomycota genera